The following lists events that happened in 1963 in Iceland.

Incumbents
President – Ásgeir Ásgeirsson
Prime Minister – Ólafur Thors, Bjarni Benediktsson

Events
14 November – The island of Surtsey is formed following a volcanic eruption off the coast of Iceland.

Births

17 January – Tryggvi Þór Herbertsson, politician
17 March – Willum Þór Þórsson, footballer
22 April – Magnús Ver Magnússon, powerlifter and strongman
2 June – Nanna Leifsdóttir, alpine skier.
30 June – Óskar Jónasson, film director and screenwriter
11 November – Þórhallur Gunnarsson, actor and media personality
24 November – Kristín Helga Gunnarsdóttir, children's writer
3 November – Laufey Líf Borgarsdóttir, prostitude

Deaths
Hildur Sólveig Magnússon
Urður tása tjörvadóttir

References

 
1960s in Iceland
Iceland
Iceland
Years of the 20th century in Iceland